(Spanish for "The Anthill") is a Spanish television program with a live audience focusing on comedy, science, and guest interviews running since September 2006. It is hosted and produced by screenwriter Pablo Motos. The show aired on Spain's Cuatro channel from launch until June 2011 and is now broadcast on Antena 3. Recurring guests on the show include Luis Piedrahita, Raquel Martos,  ("The Man in Black"; the scientists), and puppet ants  (from the Spanish expression , which means "in fits and starts"). It has proved a ratings success, and has expanded from a weekly 120-minute show to a daily 40-minute show in its third season, which began on 17 September 2007.

On a Cadena SER interview, he revealed that he had once been offered to take the show to Telecinco, but he preferred to stay with Cuatro. He eventually an accepted an offer to move to Antena 3, when Mediaset España refused to meet the €90,000 per episode fee that 7yAcción proposed.

The show won the Entertainment prize at the 2009 Rose d'Or ceremony.

Format
The show is based on an earlier radio program, broadcast on M80 Radio, called No Somos Nadie ("We Are Nobody"). This show continued until June 2007, when Pablo Motos announced that he would be leaving the program to allow the daily production of El Hormiguero. No Somos Nadie returned in September 2007 with new on-air talent, since most of the old show's talent were part of the television adaptation.

Segments on the show included scientific experiments, like a car running on vegetable oil, hangover cures, a superconductivity demonstration, and various chemical reaction demonstrations. Each episode features a satirical rap, commentary on current events, and humorous phrases as spoken by children. Other segments include pitches for viewers to plant trees and "El Kiosco", a section of magazine reviews. The show also airs parodies of other media, which have included Back to the Future, Pop Idol, House M.D., and Mission: Impossible. Each episode features a celebrity guest, including Boris Izaguirre, David Bisbal, Alejandro Sanz, Paulina Rubio, Dani Martin, Nuria Roca and numerous international celebrities such as Miley Cyrus, Sergio Dalma, Ashley Tisdale or Hugh Jackman. Special guests on the show are sometimes involved throughout the episode, including taking part in the various stunts and science experiments. A number of changes to the show, including new segments such as a webcam call-in portion from viewers, were planned for the upcoming format change in the third season, however this segment and some others like training of wild monkeys were removed, the first one due to the amount of time needed and the second one due to low popularity among the audience.

A segment that was later introduced is "Extreme Survival", that features "El maestro empanao" (which roughly translates as "Master Dumbass") Marron and the host Pablo Motos testing out tips and hints on how to survive extreme situations or conditions (such as how to survive being overrun by a car, trapped in a falling lift, attacked by a pack of wolves, etc.). Another segment includes Trancas and Barrancas making fun of the day's news. A satirical news show in which puppets read the news, Las noticias del guiñol, formerly aired on Cuatro.

When Jorge Salvador appeared on the show in 2020, he revealed that Trancas and Barrancas were originally intended to be sock puppets, until Pablo suggested they should be ants.

International attention

The show first received international attention in 2006 for having people walk across a swimming pool filled with a non-Newtonian fluid, a suspension of cornstarch and water called oobleck, that was mixed in a cement truck. This experiment was performed in an October 2006 episode of the show and was repeated with a new batch of oobleck on the Christmas Eve special episode due to its popularity.  In 2007, Cuatro signed an agreement with YouTube that allows clips from Cuatro programs, including El Hormiguero, to be showcased on the site. In 2009, El Hormiguero was awarded as the best entertainment program in the international Rose d'Or awards. The win was the fourth time a Spanish program has received the award, the first since 1994.

Since 2008, the show has received a large number of appearances from international celebrities.

In addition, sometimes, Pablo Motos has travelled to other countries to interview notable people there. This was the case in Motos' interviews with Hugh Laurie (in Los Angeles), to Rey Misterio (in the United States) or Will and Jaden Smith (in their fourth and second interviews with Motos, respectively; in London). The programme has also interviewed Will Smith with Margot Robbie.

After Jesse Eisenberg spoke negatively about his experience as guest on El Hormiguero, in an interview with Conan O'Brien on TBS's Conan, Pablo Motos gave a humorous retort to the actor and the American talk-show host from the Spanish program.

In 2011, El Hormiguero was nominated to an International Emmy Award in the Non-scripted entertainment category, but didn't win.

As told in the 16 January broadcast, Pablo Motos was offered Santiago Segura's Spanish character on Jack & Jill by Adam Sandler himself, who has been a guest on El Hormiguero on several occasions. Motos couldn't speak English, so the offer flustered him, but when he was ready to decline it, some of the show producers spoke with Sandler about the idea, reaching an agreement: They would send a screen test with Pablo performing his lines, learned by phonetic sounds. Jorge Ventosa, one of the producers, performed Sandler's female role. Motos and Segura (who is a frequent collaborator) decided to broadcast the audition during an interview on the programme, promoting the release of the movie.

In 2009, Siete y Acción licensed the show's format to Grundy Italy, an Italian production company, to produce a local version of the show, but its pilot was never picked up. Also in 2009, Chilean and Portuguese versions were produced: in Chile the show flopped and was axed within a month; the Portuguese version ran successfully until 2013 in various timeslots on SIC. In June 2010 the Mexican version of the show premiered: it was produced for two series but was unexpectedly cancelled during its second series as a cost-cutting measure by TV Azteca. The Brazilian version premiered ten days afterwards, but was axed within a year. In 2013 there was an attempt by Will Smith to move the format to the United States, showing interest in the NBC or CBS networks, but it did not materialise. The programme has also been adapted successfully in China by Hunan Television (though it has been suggested by producers that the local network haven't paid for the rights). According to producers 7yAcción, the programme has been piloted additionally in Argentina, Colombia, Germany and Romania.

Cast
Pablo Motos – Himself – Host
Juan Ibáñez Pérez – Himself – Trancas Petancas
Damián Molla Herman – Himself – Barrancas
Pablo Ibáñez Pérez – El Hombre de Negro (The Man in Black). He left the program in March 2017.
Enrique Pérez Vergara – "Flipy", El científico loco (The Mad Scientist) (Until 5th season)
Jandro – Super-Fan, El experto en todo (The expert in everything) and Contador de chistes con carteles (Jokes with posters) (5th season)
Mario Vaquerizo – Himself
Raquel Martos González – Herself
Luis Piedrahita – El rey de las cosas pequeñas (The King of Little Things) and "Mago que revela sus propios trucos" (Magician that reveals his own tricks) (5th season)
Jorge Marrón Martín – El Maestro Empanao (The Dumbass Master), "El efecto mariposa" (The Butterfly effect), "El científico" (5th Season, The Scientist)
 Yibing: She first appeared on 24 January 2017, and she shows the curiosities of China. She replaces Anna Simon after her absence.
 Mónica Cruz: She participates in the 12th edition of the programme. Her section is called Mónica cool, where she teaches how to survive the latest trends.
 Juan Del Val
 Cristina Pardo: Her section is called Podría ser peor and ''tertulia
 Joaquín Sánchez
 Cristina Pedroche
 Antonio Resines: His section is called "El juez Resines".

Episodes

Notes Guest international and Spanish

References

External links

Official site 
Pablo Motos unofficial blog 
El Hormiguero – Trancas y Barrancas Fan Forum 
El Blog de el Hormiguero 
 
 Full Credits at the Internet Movie Database

Media
Various excerpts of El Hormiguero at YouTube. 
Pablo Motos and Flipy walk on oobleck (video) 
Video excerpts of El Hormiguero 

2006 Spanish television series debuts
Spanish comedy television series
Antena 3 (Spanish TV channel) original programming
Spanish television shows featuring puppetry